Azariah ("Yah has helped") was a prophet described in 2 Chronicles 15.

Biblical narrative 
The Spirit of God is described as coming upon him (verse 1), and he goes to meet King Asa of Judah to exhort him to carry out a work of reform. In response to Azariah's encouragement, Asa carried out a number of reforms including the destruction of idols and repairs to the altar of Yahweh in the Jerusalem Temple complex. The Bible records that a period of peace followed the carrying out of these reforms (verse 19).

Azariah is described as being the "son of Oded" (verse 1), but the Masoretic Text omits Azariah's name in verse 8, suggesting that the prophecy is from Oded himself.

References 

Prophets of the Hebrew Bible
Books of Chronicles people